Strictly Come Dancing returned for its fourth series on 7 October 2006 and ended on 23 December. Bruce Forsyth and Tess Daly returned to co-present the main show on BBC One, whilst Claudia Winkleman returned to present spin-off show Strictly Come Dancing: It Takes Two on BBC Two for the third series in a row. Len Goodman, Bruno Tonioli, Craig Revel Horwood and Arlene Phillips returned as judges. The winner was Mark Ramprakash and his dancing partner Karen Hardy.

Couples
This year there were 14 couples: 7 male celebrities and 7 female celebrities. They were:

Scoring chart

Average chart

Highest and lowest scoring performances
The best and worst performances in each dance according to the judges' marks are as follows:

Couples' highest and lowest scoring dances

Weekly scores and songs
Unless indicated otherwise, individual judges scores in the charts below (given in parentheses) are listed in this order from left to right: Craig Revel Horwood, Arlene Phillips, Len Goodman, Bruno Tonioli.

Week 1
Running order

Week 2

Running order

Week 3
Running order

Week 4
Running order

Week 5

Running order

Week 6
Running order

Week 7
Running order

Week 8
Running order

Week 9

Running order

Week 10: Quarter-final

Running order

Week 11: Semi-final

Running order

Week 12: Final

Running order

Dance chart
 Highest scoring dance
 Lowest scoring dance

Week 1: Male celebrities – Waltz or Cha-Cha-Cha; Female celebrities – group Mambo
Week 2: Female celebrities – Quickstep or Rumba; Male celebrities – group Swing
Week 3: Tango or Jive
Week 4: Foxtrot or Paso Doble
Week 5: Viennese Waltz or Salsa
Week 6: American Smooth or Samba
Week 7: One unlearned dance
Week 8: One unlearned dance
Week 9: Two unlearned dances (one Ballroom, one Latin)
Week 10: Two unlearned dances (one Ballroom, one Latin)
Week 11: One unlearned dance and Argentine Tango
Week 12 (Final): Favourite Ballroom, favourite Latin, a dance choreographed to the same piece of music, a joint Viennese Waltz, and Showdance

External links

Season 04
2006 British television seasons